Davis Cove was a small settlement in the Placentia district of Newfoundland, Canada. It was served by the C.N.R. Express circa 1953. It became a Post Office town in 1949 and was still active in the late 1960s. It had a population of 182 in 1956. At present it is a mix of separated dwellings.

See also
 List of communities in Newfoundland and Labrador

Ghost towns in Newfoundland and Labrador